Port Lions (  in Alutiiq) is a city located on Kodiak Island in the Kodiak Island Borough of the U.S. state of Alaska. As of the 2010 census, the population of the city was 194, down from 256 in 2000.

Port Lions was built to house the inhabitants of Ag'waneq from the neighboring island of Afognak and Port Wakefield from Raspberry Island, after their villages were destroyed by the Good Friday earthquake in 1964.  Port Lions was built with help from the United States government and the Lions Club. It was named in honor of the club.

Geography
Port Lions is located at  (57.868070, -152.880047).

Demographics

Port Lions first appeared on the 1970 U.S. Census, having previously incorporated in 1966.

As of the census of 2000, there were 256 people, 89 households, and 76 families residing in the city. There were 106 housing units at an average density of 16.7 per square mile (6.4/km2). The racial makeup of the city was 34.77% White, 63.28% Native American, and 1.95% from two or more races.  1.95% of the population were Hispanic or Latino of any race.

There were 89 households, out of which 44.9% had children under the age of 18 living with them, 74.2% were married couples living together, 7.9% had a female householder with no husband present, and 14.6% were non-families. 13.5% of all households were made up of individuals, and 4.5% had someone living alone who was 65 years of age or older.  The average household size was 2.88 and the average family size was 3.11.

In the city, the age distribution of the population shows 33.2% under the age of 18, 3.9% from 18 to 24, 29.7% from 25 to 44, 26.2% from 45 to 64, and 7.0% who were 65 years of age or older.  The median age was 36 years. For every 100 females, there were 113.3 males.  For every 100 females age 18 and over, there were 106.0 males.

The median income for a household in the city was $39,107, and the median income for a family was $42,656. Males had a median income of $41,250 versus $30,625 for females. The per capita income for the city was $17,492.  About 12.7% of families and 12.1% of the population were below the poverty line, including 15.0% of those under the age of eighteen and 10.7% of those 65 or over.

Communications
Stanford University operates a remote scientific radio receiver in Port Lions to study very low frequency radio signals.

Education
The Port Lions School, a K-12 rural school, is operated by the Kodiak Island Borough School District.

References

1966 establishments in Alaska
Cities in Alaska
Cities in Kodiak Island Borough, Alaska
Lions Clubs International
Populated coastal places in Alaska on the Pacific Ocean
Populated places established in 1966